The 1922 Women's Olympiad ( and ) was the second international women's sports event, a 7-day multi-sport event organised by Alice Milliat and held on 15– April 23 1922 in Monte Carlo at the International Sporting Club of Monaco. The tournament was formally called "Deuxiéme Meeting International d'Éducation Physique Féminine".
It was also the second of three Women's Olympiads or "Monte Carlo Games" held annually at the venue in Monaco, and the second forerunner of the quadrennial Women's World Games, organised in 1922–34 by the International Women's Sports Federation founded by Milliat in late 1921.

Events
The games were organized as the previous 1921 Women's Olympiad by Fédération des Sociétés Féminines Sportives de France (FSFSF) under Alice Milliat and Camille Blanc, director of the "International Sporting Club de Monaco" as a response to the International Olympic Committee (IOC) decision not to include women's events in the 1924 Olympic Games.

The games were attended by 300 participants from 7 nations: Belgium, Czechoslovakia, France, Italy, Norway (mentioned by several sources, however no Norwegian athletes appear in the result lists), Switzerland and the United Kingdom. The tournament was a huge promotion for women's sports.

The athletes competed in 11 events: running (60 metres, 250 metres, 800 metres, 4 x 75 metres relay, 4 x 175 metres relay and hurdling 65 metres), high jump, long jump, javelin, shot put and Athletics pentathlon. The tournament also held exhibition events in basketball, cycling, gymnastics and rhythmic gymnastics.

The pentathlon event was the first recorded Women's pentathlon, the 5 events were 60 metres, 300 metres, high jump, javelin, and shot put (the throwing events were two-hand). Regular women's pentathlon was introduced at the 1934 Women's World Games in London

During the games there were also events held in water sports (among the first for women outside the Olympic Games) with swimming events, where teams from the Netherlands and Sweden also participated. Events were swimming 100 metres, 200 metres and 400 metres, relays and water polo.

The tournament was held partly at the "Stade Nautique du Port" at the Monaco harbour and partly at the "Tir aux Pigeons" in the gardens Les jardins du Casino of the Monte Carlo Casino.

Results

Athletics

Almost all gold medals went to athletes from France and the United Kingdom, medalists for each event:

 Each athlete in the shot put and javelin throw events threw using their right hand, then their left. Their final mark was the total of the best mark with their right-handed throw and the best mark with their left-handed throw.

Daisy Wright and Hilda Hatt also competed in hurdles, previous winner in hurdles Germaine Delapierre participated in the high jump event.

The basketboll tournament was won by Team Haguenau after a win in the final against Team England with 9–8.

Aquatics

The swimming events were held April 20–23, participants from Belgium, Denmark, France, Italy, Netherlands, Sweden and United Kingdom competed in 10 events. During the competitions Sweden secured 4 victories, the Netherlands 3 victories, France won 2 events and United Kingdom won 1 event.

The water polo tournament was won by Team Netherlands after a win in the final against Team England with 6–0.

Legacy
A special commemorative medal was issued for the participants.

Later in 1922 the first Women's World Games were held in Paris, the 1923 Women's Olympiad were held at the same Monaco venue.

References

External links
 pictures (Bibliothèque nationale de France – BnF)
 pictures (Getty Images)
 pictures (Gouvernement Princier, Principauté de Monaco)
 pictures (Monaco Channel)
 film (British Pathé)
 film (YouTube)
 Participation medal

Women's World Games
International sports competitions hosted by Monaco
1922 in multi-sport events
1922 in sports
1922 in Monaco
Multi-sport events in Monaco
1922 in women's sport
1922 in water sports
Women's Olympiad